XHAGC-FM is a Spanish & English Top 40 (CHR) music radio station that serves the state of Aguascalientes, Mexico on 97.3 FM.

History
XHAGC came to air during the late 1970s as an adult contemporary Spanish station under the name of Sono Imagen, a name that lasted for two decades. In 1996, after Radio Universal formed a partnership with MVS, 97.3 FM took on the latter's FM Globo format. On October 1, 2001, this station became CHR-formatted Exa FM, continuing the relationship with MVS.

References

External links
 Official website
 Exa FM 97.3

1978 establishments in Mexico
Radio stations established in 1978
Mass media in Aguascalientes City
Radio stations in Aguascalientes
Spanish-language radio stations
Contemporary hit radio stations in Mexico